is a Japanese equestrian. He competed in two events at the 1988 Summer Olympics.

References

External links
 

1947 births
Living people
Japanese male equestrians
Olympic equestrians of Japan
Equestrians at the 1988 Summer Olympics
Place of birth missing (living people)